Bianca Ferguson (born February 11, 1955) is an American actress from Gary, Indiana.

Ferguson is best known for playing Claudia Johnston Phillips on the soap opera General Hospital from 1978 to 1987.  She was also married to the late former Designing Women actor, Meshach Taylor.

References

External links

American soap opera actresses
Actresses from Gary, Indiana
1955 births
Living people
20th-century American actresses
21st-century American women